The Dorcan Academy is a mixed secondary school in Swindon, Wiltshire, for students aged 11 to 16. The school offers a broad and balanced curriculum, with three different pathways (Foundation, Central and Extended) to suit the needs of all learners, and the opportunity for everyone to achieve the EBacc suite of qualifications.

History
Dorcan Comprehensive School was built in the 1970s. The school became a specialist technology college in 1999 (known as Dorcan Technology College). Since December 2011 the school converted to an academy.

Extra-curricular activities
The school offers a range of extra-curricular activities to complement what is offered by the school curriculum. This is reviewed by staff each term and includes:

 Sports teams
 Instrumental, performing and vocal activities
 Drama productions
 Use of the art rooms during breaks and after school
 Use of school computer equipment during breaks and after school
 After school homework support
 STEM Club (Science, Technology, Engineering and Mathematics)
 Media, History, Geography, Business, ICT and modern languages clubs
 Theatre trips
 Duke of Edinburgh Award activities and expeditions
 Residential trips abroad to France, Germany, Poland, Russia, and United States

Ofsted and academic performance
In March 2009, the school became a Foundation School. Since 2005, the percentage of pupils achieving five GCSEs at grades A*–C has steadily improved. Following the disappointment of the 2007 inspection, reports have followed a similar pattern of steady overall improvement, with the school gaining an overall rating of "satisfactory" in 2011.

References

External links
 
 

Secondary schools in Swindon
Educational institutions established in 1970
1970 establishments in England
Academies in Swindon